Inadan may refer to:
Inadan (city), a city in South Africa
Inadan (African caste), a social stratum among the Tuareg people